Ultraliga Season 7 was the 8th edition of the Ultraliga. PDW sold their spot and therefore were not able to defend the title. It was the first season Ultraliga covered more than just Poland, as the Baltic States were added to the league. The league was therefore expanded from 8 to 10 teams and Expansion Tournament was held after season 6 to determine 2 new teams, Goskilla and Iron Wolves qualified for Season 7 through it. The competition was won by AGO ROGUE as they won their 4th Ultraliga title.

Promotion/Relegation
18 August 2021

Komil&Friends defended their spot in Ultraliga
Gentlemen's Gaming defended their spot in Ultraliga

Expansion Tournament
10 October 2021 – 18 October 2021

Upper Bracket

Lower Bracket

Iron Wolves and Goskilla qualified to Ultraliga

Regular Season
11 January 2022 – 9 March 2022

Playoffs
15 March 2022 – 30 March 2022

Upper Bracket and Final

Lower Bracket

AGO ROGUE and Team ESCA Gaming qualified for European Masters 2022 Spring Group Stage
Iron Wolves and Zero Tenacity qualified for European Masters 2022 Spring Play In Stage

References

Ultraliga seasons